Spania is a genus of snipe flies of the family Rhagionidae.

Spania are small - 2 to 3.0 mm, dark brown to black in colour.

Species
Spania americana Johnson, 1923
Spania kyushuensis Nagatomi & Saigusa, 1982
Spania naitoi Nagatomi & Saigusa, 1982
Spania nigra Meigen, 1830
Stylospania lancifera Frey, 1954

References

Brachycera genera
Rhagionidae
Diptera of Europe
Diptera of Asia
Diptera of North America
Diptera of Australasia
Taxa named by Johann Wilhelm Meigen